The High Point Rockers are an American professional baseball team based at Truist Point ballpark in High Point, North Carolina, which is part of the Piedmont Triad region. They are members of the South Division of the Atlantic League of Professional Baseball, a "partner league" of Major League Baseball.

History
Shortly before the conclusion of the 2017 season, the city of Bridgeport, Connecticut, voted to not continue with professional baseball in the city and announced plans to convert The Ballpark at Harbor Yard into a music amphitheater. On August 7, 2017, the Bridgeport Bluefish announced that the 2017 season would be the team's last in Bridgeport after playing in the city for 20 years. On September 8, 2017, Frank Boulton (league founder and a team owner) announced that the Bluefish would move to High Point, North Carolina. The league instead unanimously approved a new franchise in High Point on March 12, 2018, to replace the Bluefish to begin play in 2019.

Ground was officially broken on April 11, 2018, for the new ballpark in High Point, to be called BB&T Point (now Truist Point).

On June 7, 2018, a "Name the Team" contest was launched with nine finalists: Chairmen, Dragon Claws, Hush Puppies, Iron Dragons, Iron Eagles, Pioneers, Rockers, and Splinters. On June 21, 2018, the names were narrowed down to Dragon Claws, Rockers, and Splinters. On July 12, 2018, Rockers was chosen as the team name.

On November 28, 2018, the High Point Rockers announced Jamie Keefe as the team's first manager and Frank Viola as the Rockers' first pitching coach.

On April 1, 2019, the team revealed their mascot, a rocking horse, and invited the public to submit name suggestions.

The Rockers won their inaugural home game, defeating the Sugar Land Skeeters on May 2, 2019.

Current roster

Season by season results

References

External links
Official website

2018 establishments in North Carolina
Baseball teams established in 2018
Atlantic League of Professional Baseball teams
Professional baseball teams in North Carolina
High Point, North Carolina
Sports in the Piedmont Triad